Apple cakes are cakes in which apples feature as a main flavour and ingredient. Such cakes incorporate apples in a variety of forms, including diced, pureed, or stewed, and can include common additions like raisins, nuts, and 'sweet' spices such as cinnamon or nutmeg. They are a common and popular dessert worldwide, thanks to millennia of apple cultivation in Asia and Europe, and their widespread introduction and propagation throughout the Americas during the Columbian Exchange and colonisation. As a result, apple desserts, including cakes, have a huge number of variations.

Apples are also used in other cakes to add moisture and sweetness, often as a partial substitute for refined sugar.

Varieties

British & Irish
Regions of Great Britain and Ireland have the ideal climate for apple growing, making apple cake a common dessert with many regional varieties throughout. However, it is in the traditionally agricultural West Country of England that apple cakes have been raised as culinary symbols of their counties, such as Dorset apple cake, Devonshire apple cake, and Somerset apple cake. They are characterised by the use of wholemeal flour and often a combination of dessert apples and Bramley apples, and are typically served warm with cream or custard, or more rarely, with cheese.

Polish

An apple cake called szarlotka or jabłecznik is a common traditional dessert in Poland, made from sweet pastry crust and spiced apple filling. It can be topped with kruszonka (crumbles), meringue, or a dusting of caster (powdered) sugar. An additional layer of budyń (a Polish variation of custard) can sometimes be found. In restaurants and cafes, it is usually served hot with whipped cream and coffee.

Scandinavian
In Scandinavia, apple cakes are typically prepared from sour apples and baked in a dough made from sugar, butter, flour, eggs, and baking powder. The cake is then topped with apples, cinnamon and sugar, sometimes also chopped almonds. Apple crumble pie is also common. In Sweden it's usually served lukewarm with whipped cream, custard (vanilla sauce) or vanilla ice cream.

French 
An apple cake called tarte tatin is an upside down apple pie, very popular in France. According to the Larousse Gastronomique, it was created by the sisters Tatin and democratized in their restaurant "Lamotte-Beuvron" in the 19th century. 

This apple pie is actually a derivative of an old Solognese speciality with apples or pears. It has existed for a very long time, and the recipe was passed down from mother to daughter. 

Traditionally the bottom of the pan is generously lined with butter and a layer of granulated or powdered sugar is added.

On top of this mixture, apple wedges are placed and sugar is sprinkled on it. A shortcrust pastry thinly arranged is placed on the apples. The cake is served hot, often with a ball of vanilla ice cream.

See also
 Applesauce cake
 Apple pie
 List of apple dishes
 List of cakes
 List of Polish dishes

References

British cakes
German cakes
Polish desserts
Cake